Jamie Pitt (born 11 May 1989, in Australia) is an Australian soccer player who is last known to have played for Palm Beach SC of the National Premier Leagues Queensland in Australia.

Balestier Khalsa

Arriving as a Prime League player to Singaporean club Balestier Khalsa in June 2009, Pitt scored his second goal for the Tigers in a 5–1 loss to Super Reds FC, with his first in a 2–1 win over Young Lions. Released from Balestier in December that year along with all their foreign players, the Singaporean media proliferated rumors that he was trialling with local team Young Lions but the mover never happened.

References

External links 
 at Soccerway.mobi

Living people
Wollongong Wolves FC players
Singapore Premier League players
Australian expatriate soccer players
1989 births
Association football defenders
Balestier Khalsa FC players
Expatriate footballers in Singapore
Australian soccer players